BSSF may refer to:

 Special Security Force Command, a paramilitary security force in Bahrain
 Bangladesh Sanjukta Sramik Federation, a trade union federation in Bangladesh